Parno Mitra (born 31 October 1986) is an Indian actress who appears in Bengali films.

Mitra started her career on television. Her acting assignment was Ravi Ojha's Bengali TV series Khela (2007). She was catapulted to stardom after she enacted Ranjana in Anjan Dutta's National Award winning Bengali film Ranjana Ami Ar Ashbona (2011).

Early life
Mittra was born in Kolkata. Her father worked in Arunachal Pradesh, and she spent most of her childhood days there. She studied at Dow Hill School in Kurseong, Darjeeling and Pratt Memorial School in Kolkata.

Career
Mittra's debut TV serial was Khela (2007), a Ravi Ojha production in which she played Indira. She acted in another popular Ravi Ojha production, Mohona, as the lead character. She got the Best Actress award for Mohona. She acted opposite Abir Chatterjee in Shomoy and played the second lead in Bou Kotha Kao.

She made her film debut with Anjan Dutt's Ranjana Ami Ar Ashbona (2011). It received three National Awards for Best Bengali Film, Special Jury Award and Best Music.

She starred opposite Parambrata Chattopadhyay as Ashima in director Kaushik Ganguly's Apur Panchali, which was screened at the 44th International Film Festival of India (IFFI) in November 2013.

Some of her other notable films are Bedroom, Ami Aar Amar Girlfriends, Maach Mishti More and Ekla Akash. She played a double role in Glamour.

In 2015, she had three releases: Bheetu, Glamour and Srijit Mukherjee's Rajkahini. (Rajkahini is being made in Hindi as Begum Jaan which is being produced by Mahesh and Mukesh Bhatt.) She acted in Pratim D Gupta's X Past Is Present, which featured Rajat Kapoor.

Mittra has signed up for Bangladeshi director Mostafa Sarwar Farooki's bilingual international film featuring Irrfan Khan and Rokeya Prachy of Tareque Masud's The Clay Bird.

In 2018 she played the main role as Brishti in Alinagarer Golokdhadha opposite Anirban Bhattacharya and directed by Sayantan Ghosal.

Her upcoming films include Arindam Sil's Indo-Bangla project Balighawr, and Pratim D Gupta's Ahare Mon.

Political career 

Mittra joined Bharatiya Janata Party in 2021 and contested the 2021 West Bengal Legislative Assembly election from Baranagar constituency. She lost the election to Tapas Roy of All India Trinamool Congress by 35,147 votes. Mitra was later criticised by Tathagata Roy who called her Nagarir Nati.

Filmography

TV series

Mahalaya

References

External links 

 
 

Living people
1989 births
Bengali television actresses
University of Calcutta alumni
Indian film actresses
Indian television actresses
21st-century Indian actresses
Actresses from Kolkata
Bharatiya Janata Party politicians from West Bengal
Indian actor-politicians